Shaun Murawski (born in Glasgow) is a Scottish photographer, who became the youngest photographer to ever be selected to take a formal portrait of Her Majesty The Queen. He was selected in May 2010 by the Scottish Parliament after submissions were made by art schools, universities and college across Scotland.

The portrait was unveiled by The Princess Royal, Princess Anne in May 2011, and currently hangs in the public area of Holyrood Parliament in Edinburgh.

References

Scottish photographers
Living people
Year of birth missing (living people)